RKSV Leonidas is a football club from Rotterdam, Netherlands. Leonidas is playing in the Sunday Eerste Klasse (6th tier), after relegation from the 2015–16 Sunday Hoofdklasse A.

The club won the 2012 KNVB Amateur Cup. In 1999, Leonidas won the KNVB District Cup in the (now defunct) West IV District.

References

External links
 Official site

Football clubs in the Netherlands
Football clubs in Rotterdam
1909 establishments in the Netherlands
Association football clubs established in 1909